Stenoptilia meyeri is a moth of the family Pterophoridae found on the Azores. It was first described by Cees Gielis in 1997.

References

meyeri
Endemic arthropods of the Azores
Moths described in 1997
Plume moths of Europe
Taxa named by Cees Gielis